The 1946–47 Ranji Trophy was the 13th season of the Ranji Trophy. Baroda won the title defeating Holkar in the final.

Highlights
Vijay Hazare and Gul Mohammad added 577 runs for the fourth wicket in the final between Baroda and Holkar. This was a world record for any wicket in first class for nearly sixty years. It is still a record for the fourth wicket.

Zonal Matches

West Zone

South Zone

East Zone

North Zone

Inter-Zonal Knockout matches

Final

Scorecards and averages
Cricketarchive

References

External links

1947 in Indian cricket
Indian domestic cricket competitions